Isochariesthes tricolor is a species of beetle in the family Cerambycidae. It was described by Stephan von Breuning in 1964, originally under the genus Chariesthes. It is known from the Democratic Republic of the Congo.

References

tricolor
Beetles described in 1964
Endemic fauna of the Democratic Republic of the Congo